Tintyava Peak is the ice-covered peak rising to 1026 m in the north foothills of Louis-Philippe Plateau on Trinity Peninsula in Graham Land, Antarctica.  It is surmounting the upper course of Sestrimo Glacier to the east-southeast.

The peak is named after the settlement of Tintyava in Southern Bulgaria.

Location
German-British mapping in 1996.

Maps
 Trinity Peninsula. Scale 1:250000 topographic map No. 5697. Institut für Angewandte Geodäsie and British Antarctic Survey, 1996.
 Antarctic Digital Database (ADD). Scale 1:250000 topographic map of Antarctica. Scientific Committee on Antarctic Research (SCAR). Since 1993, regularly updated.

Notes

References
 Tintyava Peak. SCAR Composite Antarctic Gazetteer
 Bulgarian Antarctic Gazetteer. Antarctic Place-names Commission. (details in Bulgarian, basic data in English)

External links
 Tintyava Peak. Copernix satellite image

Mountains of Trinity Peninsula
Bulgaria and the Antarctic